Dorstenia grazielae is a plant species in the family Moraceae which is native to eastern Brazil.

References

grazielae
Plants described in 1973
Flora of Brazil